Abdul Samadu Musafiri is a Ugandan football manager who was in charge of Kenyan side Nairobi City Stars in 2017, and Ugandan Premier League club MYDA FC in 2021.

References

Living people
Expatriate football managers in Kenya
Football managers in Kenya
Year of birth missing (living people)